The 1947–48 National Hurling League was the 17th season of the NHL, an annual hurling competition for the GAA county teams. Cork won the league, beating Tipperary by 3-3 to 1-2 in the final.

References

National Hurling League seasons
League
League